Oakfield is a village in Fond du Lac County, Wisconsin, United States. The population was 1,052 at the 2020 census. The village is located within the Town of Oakfield.

History
A post office called Oakfield has been in operation since 1850. The village was named for a grove of oak trees near the original town site.

On July 18, 1996, an F5 tornado ripped through the village, destroying 47 homes but killing no one.

Geography
Oakfield is located at  (43.684167, -88.548551).

Demographics

2010 census
As of the census of 2010, there were 1,075 people, 392 households, and 307 families living in the village. The racial makeup of the village was 96.9% White, 0.2% African American, 0.3% Native American, 0.4% Asian, 0.3% from other races, and 2.0% from two or more races. Hispanic or Latino of any race were 1.8% of the population.

There were 392 households, of which 36.7% had children under the age of 18 living with them, 66.1% were married couples living together, 8.7% had a female householder with no husband present, 3.6% had a male householder with no wife present, and 21.7% were non-families. 19.1% of all households were made up of individuals, and 7.9% had someone living alone who was 65 years of age or older. The average household size was 2.74 and the average family size was 3.13.

The median age in the village was 40.3 years. 26.2% of residents were under the age of 18; 8.6% were between the ages of 18 and 24; 22.7% were from 25 to 44; 29.7% were from 45 to 64; and 12.7% were 65 years of age or older. The gender makeup of the village was 49.3% male and 50.7% female.

2000 census
As of the census of 2000, there were 1,012 people, 370 households, and 283 families living in the village. The population density was 1,049.9 people per square mile (407.0/km2). There were 384 housing units at an average density of 398.4 per square mile (154.4/km2). The racial makeup of the village was 98.42% White, 0.10% Black or African American, 0.30% Native American, 0.30% Asian, 0.59% from other races, and 0.30% from two or more races. 2.87% of the population were Hispanic or Latino of any race.

There were 370 households, out of which 39.5% had children under the age of 18 living with them, 63.5% were married couples living together, 7.8% had a female householder with no husband present, and 23.5% were non-families. 20.0% of all households were made up of individuals, and 10.8% had someone living alone who was 65 years of age or older. The average household size was 2.74 and the average family size was 3.15.

In the village, the population was spread out, with 28.5% under the age of 18, 7.0% from 18 to 24, 29.6% from 25 to 44, 23.3% from 45 to 64, and 11.6% who were 65 years of age or older. The median age was 36 years. For every 100 females, there were 98.0 males. For every 100 females age 18 and over, there were 101.1 males.

The median income for a household in the village was $51,053, and the median income for a family was $56,154. Males had a median income of $37,833 versus $24,625 for females. The per capita income for the village was $21,131. About 1.1% of families and 1.9% of the population were below the poverty line, including none of those under age 18 and 8.3% of those age 65 or over.

Notable people
Edson A. Putnam, Wisconsin State Representative, lived in Oakfield.
Henry A. Ripley, Wisconsin State Representative, lived in Oakfield.
William F. Sommerfield, Wisconsin State Representative, lived in Oakfield.

References

External links
 Village of Oakfield

Villages in Fond du Lac County, Wisconsin
Villages in Wisconsin